The rail profile is the cross sectional shape of a railway rail, perpendicular to its length.

Early rails were made of wood, cast iron or wrought iron. All modern rails are hot rolled steel with a cross section (profile) approximate to an I-beam, but asymmetric about a horizontal axis (however see grooved rail below). The head is profiled to resist wear and to give a good ride, and the foot profiled to suit the fixing system.

Unlike some other uses of iron and steel, railway rails are subject to very high stresses and are made of very high quality steel. It took many decades to improve the quality of the materials, including the change from iron to steel. Minor flaws in the steel that may pose no problems in other applications can lead to broken rails and dangerous derailments when used on railway tracks.

By and large, the heavier the rails and the rest of the track work, the heavier and faster the trains these tracks can carry.

Rails represent a substantial fraction of the cost of a railway line. Only a small number of rail sizes are made by steelworks at one time, so a railway must choose the nearest suitable size. Worn, heavy rail from a mainline is often reclaimed and downgraded for re-use on a branch line, siding or yard.

History

Early rails were used on horse drawn wagonways, originally with wooden rails, but from the 1760s using strap-iron rails, which consisted of thin strips of cast iron fixed onto wooden rails.<ref name="Bianculli2002">{{cite book|last=Bianculli|first= Anthony J.|title=Trains and Technology: The American Railroad in the Nineteenth Century|publisher=  University of Delaware Press|date= 2002|url=https://archive.org/details/trainstechnology0000bian|url-access=registration|page=85|chapter= Ch 5 From Strap Iron to High Iron|isbn=0-87413-802-7}}</ref> These rails were too fragile to carry heavy loads, but because the initial construction cost was less, this method was sometimes used to quickly build an inexpensive rail line. Strap rails sometimes separated from the wooden base and speared into the floor of the carriages above, creating what was referred to as a "snake head".  However, the long-term expense involved in frequent maintenance outweighed any savings.

These were superseded by cast iron rails that were flanged (i.e. 'L' shaped) and with the wagon wheels flat. An early proponent of this design was Benjamin Outram of B. Outram & Co. which later became the Butterley Company in Ripley. His partner William Jessop preferred the use of "edge rails" in 1789 where the wheels were flanged and, over time, it was realised that this combination worked better. William Jessop's (fishbellied) "edge rails" were cast by the Butterley Company.

The earliest of these in general use were the so-called cast iron fishbelly rails from their shape. Rails made from cast iron were brittle and broke easily. They could only be made in short lengths which would soon become uneven. John Birkinshaw's 1820 patent, as rolling techniques improved, introduced wrought iron in longer lengths, replaced cast iron and contributed significantly to the explosive growth of railroads in the period 1825–40. The cross-section varied widely from one line to another, but were of three basic types as shown in the diagram. The parallel cross-section which developed in later years was referred to as bullhead.

Meanwhile, in May 1831, the first flanged T rail (also called T-section) arrived in America from Britain and was laid into the Pennsylvania Railroad by Camden and Amboy Railroad. They were also used by Charles Vignoles in Britain.

The first steel rails were made in 1857 by Robert Forester Mushet, who laid them at Derby station in England. Steel is a much stronger material, which steadily replaced iron for use on railway rail and allowed much longer lengths of rails to be rolled.

The American Railway Engineering Association (AREA) and the American Society for Testing Materials (ASTM) specified carbon, manganese, silicon and phosphorus content for steel rails. Tensile strength increases with carbon content, while ductility decreases. Manganese increases strength and resistance to abrasion. AREA and ASTM specified 0.6 to 0.9 percent manganese in 70 to 90 pound rail and 0.7 to 1 percent in heavier rails. Silicon is preferentially oxidised by oxygen and is added to reduce the formation of weakening metal oxides in the rail rolling and casting procedures. AREA and ASTM specified 0.1 to 0.23 percent silicon. Phosphorus and sulfur are impurities causing brittle rail with reduced impact-resistance. AREA and ASTM specified maximum phosphorus concentration of 0.04 percent.

The use of welded rather than jointed track began in around the 1940s and had become widespread by the 1960s.

Types

Strap rail

The earliest rails were simply lengths of timber.  To resist wear a thin iron strap was laid on top of the timber rail.  This saved money as wood was cheaper than metal. The system had the flaw that every so often the passage of the wheels on the train would cause the strap to break away from the timber. The problem was first reported by Richard Trevithick in 1802.  The use of strap rails in the United States (for instance on the Albany and Schenectady Railroad  1837) led to passengers being threatened by "snake-heads" when the straps curled up and penetrated the carriages.

T rail
T-rail was a development of strap rail which had a 'T' cross-section formed by widening the top of the strap into a head. This form of rail was generally short-lived, being phased out in America by 1855.

Plate rail

Plate rail was an early type of rail and had an 'L' cross-section in which the flange kept an unflanged wheel on the track. The flanged rail has seen a minor revival in the 1950s, as guide bars, with the Paris Métro (Rubber-tyred metro or French Métro sur pneus) and more recently as the Guided bus. The buses run on normal road wheels with side-mounted guidewheels to run against the flanges. Buses are steered normally when off the busway, analogous to the 18th-century wagons which could be manoeuvered around pitheads before joining the track for the longer haul.

Bridge rail

Bridge rail is a rail with an inverted-U profile. Its simple shape is easy to manufacture, and it was widely used before more sophisticated profiles became cheap enough to make in bulk. It was notably used on the Great Western Railway's  gauge baulk road, designed by Isambard Kingdom Brunel.

Barlow rail

Barlow rail was invented by William Henry Barlow in 1849. It was designed to be laid straight onto the ballast, but the lack of sleepers (ties) meant that it was difficult to keep it in gauge.

Flat bottomed rail

Flat bottomed rail is the dominant rail profile in worldwide use.

Flanged T rail
Flanged T rail (also called T-section) is the name for flat bottomed rail used in North America.
Iron-strapped wooden rails were used on all American railways until 1831. Col. Robert L. Stevens, the President of the Camden and Amboy Railroad, conceived the idea that an all-iron rail would be better suited for building a railroad. There were no steel mills in America capable of rolling long lengths, so he sailed to the United Kingdom which was the only place where his flanged T rail (also called T-section) could be rolled. Railways in the UK had been using rolled rail of other cross-sections which the ironmasters had produced.

Afterwards, the flanged T rail became employed by all railroads in the United States.

Col. Stevens also invented the hooked spike for attaching the rail to the crosstie (or sleeper). At the present time, the screw spike is being used widely in place of the hooked spike.

Vignoles rail

Vignoles rail is the popular name of the flat-bottomed rail, recognising engineer Charles Vignoles who introduced it to Britain.
Charles Vignoles observed that wear was occurring with wrought iron rails and cast iron chairs upon stone blocks, the most common system at that time. In 1836 he recommended flat-bottomed rail to the London and Croydon Railway for which he was consulting engineer.
His original rail had a smaller cross-section than the Stevens rail, with a wider base than modern rail, fastened with screws through the base. Other lines which adopted it were the Hull and Selby, the Newcastle and North Shields, and the Manchester, Bolton and Bury Canal Navigation and Railway Company.

When it became possible to preserve wooden sleepers with mercuric chloride (a process called Kyanising) and creosote, they gave a much quieter ride than stone blocks and it was possible to fasten the rails directly using clips or rail spikes. Their use spread worldwide and acquired Vignoles's name.

The joint where the ends of two rails are connected to each other is the weakest part of a rail line. The earliest iron rails were joined by a simple fishplate or bar of metal bolted through the web of the rail. Stronger methods of joining two rails together have been developed. When sufficient metal is put into the rail joint, the joint is almost as strong as the rest of the rail length. The noise generated by trains passing over the rail joints, described as "the clickity clack of the railroad track", can be eliminated by welding the rail sections together. Continuously welded rail has a uniform top profile even at the joints.

Double-headed rail

In late 1830s Britain, railway lines had a vast range of different patterns. One of the earliest lines to use double-headed rail was the London and Birmingham Railway, which had offered a prize for the best design. This rail was supported by chairs and the head and foot of the rail had the same profile. The supposed advantage was that, when the head became worn, the rail could be turned over and re-used. In practice, this form of recycling was not very successful as the chair caused dents in the lower surface, and double-headed rail evolved into bullhead rail in which the head was more substantial than the foot.

Bullhead rail
Bullhead rail was the standard for the British railway system from the mid-19th until the mid-20th century. One of the first British Standards, BS 9, was for bullhead rail - it was originally published in 1905, and revised in 1924. Rails manufactured to the 1905 standard were referred to as "O.B.S." (Original), and those manufactured to the 1924 standard as "R.B.S." (Revised).

Bullhead rail is similar to double-headed rail except that the profile of the head of the rail is not the same as that of the foot. Bullhead rail evolved from double-headed rail but, because it did not have a symmetrical profile, it was never possible to flip it over and use the foot as the head. Therefore, because the rail no longer had the originally-perceived benefit of reusability, it was a very expensive method of laying track. Heavy cast iron chairs were needed to support the rail, which was secured in the chairs by wooden (later steel) wedges or "keys" which required regular attention.

Bullhead rail has now been almost completely replaced by flat-bottom rail on British railways, although it survives on the national rail system in some sidings or branch lines. It can also be found on heritage railways, due both to the desire to maintain an historic appearance, and the salvage and reuse of old track components from the main lines. The London Underground continued to use bullhead rail after it had been phased out elsewhere in Britain, but in the last few years has there been a concerted effort to convert its track to flat-bottom rail. However, the process of replacing track in tunnels is a slow process due to the impossibility of using heavy plant and machinery.

Grooved rail

Where a rail is laid in a road surface (pavement) or within grassed surfaces, there has to be accommodation for the flange.  This is provided by a slot called the flangeway.  The rail is then known as grooved rail, groove rail, or girder rail.  The flangeway has the railhead on one side and the guard on the other.  The guard carries no weight, but may act as a checkrail.

Grooved rail was invented in 1852 by Alphonse Loubat, a French inventor who developed improvements in tram and rail equipment, and helped develop tram lines in New York City and Paris.  The invention of grooved rail enabled tramways to be laid without causing a nuisance to other road users, except unsuspecting cyclists, who could get their wheels caught in the groove.  The grooves may become filled with gravel and dirt (particularly if infrequently used or after a period of idleness) and need clearing from time to time, this being done by a "scrubber" tram.  Failure to clear the grooves can lead to a bumpy ride for the passengers, damage to either wheel or rail and possibly derailing.

Girder guard rail

The traditional form of grooved rail is the girder guard section illustrated to the left.  This rail is a modified form of flanged rail and requires a special mounting for weight transfer and gauge stabilisation.  If the weight is carried by the roadway subsurface, steel ties are needed at regular intervals to maintain the gauge.  Installing these means that the whole surface needs to be excavated and reinstated.

Block rail

Block rail is a lower profile form of girder guard rail with the web eliminated.  In profile it is more like a solid form of bridge rail, with a flangeway and guard added.  Simply removing the web and combining the head section directly with the foot section would result in a weak rail, so additional thickness is required in the combined section.

A modern block rail with a further reduction in mass is the LR55 rail which is polyurethane grouted into a prefabricated concrete beam. It can be set in trench grooves cut into an existing asphalt road bed for Light Rail (trams).

Rail weights and sizes

The weight of a rail per length is an important factor in determining rail strength and hence axleloads and speeds.

Weights are measured in pounds per yard (imperial units are used in Canada, the United Kingdom and United States) or kilograms per metre (metric units are used in Australia and mainland Europe).  .

Commonly, in rail terminology pound is a metonym for the expression pounds per yard and hence a 132–pound rail means a rail of 132 pounds per yard.

Europe
Rails are made in a large number of different sizes. Some common European rail sizes include:

In the countries of the former USSR,  rails and  rails (not thermally hardened) are common. Thermally hardened  rails also have been used on heavy-duty railroads like Baikal–Amur Mainline, but have proven themselves deficient in operation and were mainly rejected in favor of  rails.

North America

Height of rail equaled width of foot for each ASCE tee-rail weight; and the profiles specified fixed proportion of weight in head, web and foot of 42%, 21% and 37%, respectively. ASCE  profile was adequate; but heavier weights were less satisfactory. The trend was to increase rail height/foot-width ratio and strengthen the web. Disadvantages of the narrower foot were overcome through use of tie plates. AREA recommendations reduced the relative weight of rail head down to 36%, while alternative profiles reduced head weight to 33% in heavier weight rails. Attention was also focused on improved fillet radii to reduce stress concentration at the web junction with the head. AREA recommended the ARA  profile. Old ASCE rails of lighter weight remained in use, and satisfied the limited demand for light rail for a few decades. AREA merged into the American Railway Engineering and Maintenance-of-Way Association in 1997. 

By the mid-20th century, most rail production was medium heavy and heavy''. Sizes under  rail are usually for lighter duty freight, low use trackage, or light rail. Track using  rail is for lower speed freight branch lines or rapid transit (for example, most of the New York City Subway system track is constructed with  rail). Main line track is usually built with  rail or heavier. Some common North American rail sizes include:

Crane rails
Some common North American crane rail sizes include:

Australia
Some common Australian rail sizes include:

 50 kg/m and 60 kg/m are the current standard, although some other sizes are still manufactured.
 Some larger U.S. sizes are used on northwest Western Australian iron ore railways.

Rail lengths

The  rail, which would be the world's longest rail line in a single piece, was rolled at URM, Bhilai Steel Plant (SAIL) on 29 November 2016. In order of date then length:
 1825  Stockton and Darlington Railway 
 1830  Liverpool and Manchester Railway  fish-belly rails 
 1850  United States (to suit  open wagons)
 1895  London and North Western Railway (UK) (four times  and two times )
 2003  (Railtrack (UK) Rail Delivery Train) 
 2010  Bhilai Steel Plant (four times  and two times )

Welding of rails into longer lengths was first introduced around 1893.  Welding can be done in a central depot, or in the field.
 1895 Hans Goldschmidt, Thermit welding.
 1935 Charles Cadwell, non-ferrous Thermit welding

Conical or cylindrical wheels

It has long been recognised that conical wheels and rails that are sloped by the same amount follow curves better than cylindrical wheels and vertical rails. A few railways such as Queensland Railways for a long time had cylindrical wheels until much heavier traffic required a change.
Cylindrical wheel treads have to "skid" on track curves so increase both drag and rail and wheel wear. On very straight track a cylindrical wheel tread rolls more freely and does not "hunt". The gauge is narrowed slightly and the flange fillets keep the flanges from rubbing the rails. United States practice is a 1 in 20 cone when new. As the tread wears it approaches an unevenly cylindrical tread, at which time the wheel is trued on a wheel lathe or replaced.

Manufacturers
Rails are made from high quality steel and not in huge quantities compared with other forms of steel, and so the number of manufacturers in any one country tends to be limited.

 AFERPI - ex Lucchini, Italy
 ArcelorMittal Steelton, United States
 ArcelorMittal Ostrava, Czech Republic
 ArcelorMittal Gijón, Spain
 ArcelorMittal Huta Katowice, Poland
 ArcelorMittal Huta Kościuszko - former Huta Królewska, Poland
 ArcelorMittal Rodange, Luxembourg
 Arrium, Whyalla, Australia formerly OneSteel
 British Steel, UK
 Evraz, Pueblo, Colorado, United States
 Evraz, Russia
 JFE Steel, Japan
 Kardemir, Turkey
 Metinvest, Ukraine
 Nippon Steel & Sumitomo Metal, Japan
 Steel Authority of India, India
 Steel Dynamics, United States
 Voestalpine, Austria

Defunct manufacturers

 Algoma Steel Company, Canada
 Australian Iron & Steel, Australia
 Barrow Steel Works, England 
 Bethlehem Steel, United States
 Călărași steel works, Romania
 Dowlais Ironworks, Wales
 Lackawanna Steel Company, United States
 Sydney Steel Corporation, Canada

Standards
 EN 13674-1 - Railway applications - Track - Rail - Part 1: Vignole railway rails 46 kg/m and above EN 13674-1
 EN 13674-4 - Railway applications - Track - Rail - Part 4: Vignole railway rails from 27 kg/m to, but excluding 46 kg/mh EN 13674-4

See also

 Common structural shapes
 Difference between train and tram rails
 Ffestiniog Railway
 Hunting oscillation
 Grooved rail
 History of rail transport
 Iron rails
 Permanent way (history)
 Plateway
 Rail lengths
 Rail Squeal
 Rail Steel Patent
 Rail tracks
 Railway guide rail
 Structural steel
 Tramway track

References

External links
 British Steel rail, Vignoles rail, grooved rail, and special rail (Switch and crossing rail, conductor rail and check rail)
 British Steel crane rail, Crane rails
 Table of North American tee rail (flat bottom) sections
 ArcelorMittal Crane Rails
 Track components and materials
 Wirth Girder Rail
 MRT Track & Services Co., Inc / Krupp, T and girder rails, scroll down.
 Railroad Facts… Construction, Safety and More.

Permanent way
Rail technologies
Structural steel